Porfirio Antonio Berroa Carbucia (February 27, 1928 – October 17, 2007) was a Dominican Republic broadcaster known for his Spanish language baseball announcing. 
A native of San Pedro de Macorís, Dominican Republic, Berroa was affectionately known as "Billy" and "El Internacional".

Recognized as one of the most important Spanish voices in baseball, Berroa began announcing Major League Baseball games in 1963, including the post-season games and All-Star competition from 1987 through 2004. He covered the New York Mets Spanish broadcasts between 1987 and 1993 and rejoined the team from 1997 to 2007, mainly on Radio WADO 1280 AM. He also called games for the New York Yankees and Philadelphia Phillies at different points in his career.

Berroa also covered the Caribbean Series, the Olympic Games, as well as professional boxing, and announced Winter League baseball in the Dominican Republic for 50 years, the last 23 years with the Escogido Lions club. On October 17, 1998, he was selected to the Dominican Republic's Sports Hall of Fame.

Berroa died of prostate cancer in Santo Domingo, D.R., at the age of 79.

References

Sources
New York Mets broadcasters
NYM/MLB obituary
El Diario (Spanish)

1928 births
2007 deaths
Major League Baseball broadcasters
New York Mets announcers
New York Yankees announcers
Philadelphia Phillies announcers
Dominican Republic sportscasters
Deaths from prostate cancer
Deaths from cancer in the Dominican Republic